Robert Ian Goldstone (born 3 December 1960) is a British publicist, music manager, and former tabloid journalist who gained international attention for his activities during the 2016 American presidential election campaign.

Early life and career 
Goldstone was born in Whitefield, Bury, Greater Manchester, where his father was a founding member of the Hillock Hebrew Congregation. He attended Delamere Forest School in Cheshire and Heys Boys' County Secondary School in Prestwich.  He left school at age 16 to become a trainee sports reporter at the Jewish Gazette. He then worked for the Radcliffe Times and, later, for the Birmingham Evening Mail.

While working as a print journalist for the Australian Associated Press (AAP), Goldstone became the only journalist to travel with Michael Jackson on his 1987 Australian BAD tour.

In 1987, Goldstone founded Oui 2 Entertainment, a publicity, marketing, and event-planning company.  Clients of the company have included the New York Friars Club, the Madison Square Boys and Girls Club, Steinway & Sons, the Russian Tea Room, and Azerbaijani pop star Emin Agalarov.  Oui 2 assisted the Trump Organization in bringing the 2013 Miss Universe Pageant to Moscow with Agaralov's father, billionaire Aras Agalarov, as host.

Meeting at Trump Tower

On 7 June 2016, on behalf of Emin Agalarov, Goldstone e-mailed Donald Trump's son Donald Trump, Jr., to request a meeting between the younger Trump and Russian lawyer Natalia Veselnitskaya (referred to in Goldstone's e-mail as a "Russian government attorney"). According to Goldstone's email, Agalarov wanted to "provide the Trump campaign with some official documents and information" that would help Donald Trump's campaign and damage the campaign of his rival, Hillary Clinton.  Donald Trump, Jr., replied immediately:  "If it's what you say[,] I love it[,] especially later in the summer."

At the request of Donald Trump, Jr., Goldstone attended the meeting, held on 9 June 2016 at Trump Tower.  The gathering included the younger Trump; Donald Trump's son-in-law, Jared Kushner; Trump's campaign manager, Paul Manafort; Aras Agaralov's employee Ike Kaveladze; Russian lawyer Natalia Veselnitskaya; former Russian counterintelligence officer Rinat Akhmetshin; and a translator.

The existence of the meeting was reported in July 2017.  Some news outlets took the meeting as evidence of collusion between the Trump campaign and the Russian government.

In an interview with The Sunday Times, Goldstone claimed: "When people said that [I was part of some Russian plot] I thought it was the most ridiculous thing I've ever heard. That doesn't mean that maybe there wasn't any Russian interference or Trump campaign collusion in other ways. I don't know. But I'm sure I wasn't part of it."

On 18 December 2017, Goldstone was interviewed by the United States House Permanent Select Committee on Intelligence.

See also
Russian interference in the 2016 United States elections

Works
 Pop Stars, Pageants & Presidents: How an Email Trumped My Life (Oui2 Entertainment, 2018)

References 

Living people
1960 births
People associated with the 2016 United States presidential election
British reporters and correspondents
British public relations people
British Jews
People from Whitefield, Greater Manchester